The Prime Minister Cup One-Day Cricket Tournament (PM Cup) is a one-day cricket tournament in Nepal organised by the Cricket Association of Nepal. It was formerly administered by the National Sports Council while CAN was suspended. It was played amongst 8 teams in 2017 and is played amongst 10 teams from 2018 onward.

History 
The National Sports Council organised the Prime Minister Cup in 2017 due to the suspension of the Cricket Association of Nepal by the International Cricket Council. A domestic one-day cricket tournament had not been held in the country for three years due to conflicts within the board which eventually led to its suspension. It replaced the National League Cricket as the premier domestic cricket tournament in Nepal, alongside the Manmohan Memorial National One-Day Cup.

Teams 
The following ten teams currently participate in the Prime Minister One Day Cup.

Defunct teams 
The following teams also appeared in the Prime Minister One Day Cup.

 Eastern Development Region (2017)
 Central Development Region (2017)
 Western Development Region (2017)
 Mid-Western Development Region (2017)
 Far-Western Development Region (2017)

Tournament season and results 
Out of the ten teams that have played in the Prime Minister One Day Cup.Armed Police Force Club won their maiden title. The Tribhuwan Army Club and the Nepal Police Club each won the title twice. The Tribhuwan Army Club are the current champion who defeated Armed Police Force Club by 33 runs in the final of 2021 Season.

Season results

Team's performance 
Legend
 – Champion
 – Runner-up
 – Semi-final
GS – Group stage

See also 

 National League Cricket
Prime Minister Cup Women's National Tournament
 Everest Premier League

Notes

References

Limited overs cricket
Nepalese domestic cricket competitions